"Master of Sparks" is a song by American rock band ZZ Top from their 1973 album Tres Hombres.

The song tells the true story of Billy Gibbons and his friend R.K. Bullock who with a workman, welded together a steel ball cage with a seat and seatbelt fitted inside. The cage generated a tail of sparks on the road but in its crushed condition stopped rolling. Still moving at high speed, the now egg shaped cage crashed into a fence. Both occupants survived relatively unscathed and were awarded the title "Master of Sparks" by the cheering crowd.

Personnel
Billy Gibbons – guitar, vocals
Dusty Hill – bass
Frank Beard – drums

References

ZZ Top songs
Songs written by Billy Gibbons
1973 songs
Song recordings produced by Bill Ham